Anthony Fernando Hunter (born February 24, 1963) is a former American football running back who played for the Green Bay Packers of the National Football League (NFL). He played college football at University of Minnesota.

References

Further reading
 
 
 
 

Living people
1963 births
Minnesota Golden Gophers football players
Green Bay Packers players
Players of American football from Tennessee
National Football League replacement players